William J. Murtagh (1923-2018) was a historian who served as the first “Keeper of the Records” for the National Register of Historic Places.

Murtagh was a native of Philadelphia, Pennsylvania and received undergraduate and graduate degrees from the University of Pennsylvania, including a Ph.D. in architectural history in 1963. He was a Fulbright scholar in Germany and also studied historic Pennsylvania Dutch barns before becoming Director of the Kemerer Museum of Decorative Arts. He then worked for the National Trust for Historic Preservation as an assistant to the president, and he served on a committee that created the 1964 publication entitled, “A report on Principles and Guideines for Historic Preservation in the United States.” The committee's report led to the creation of the National Register of Historic Places when the Historic Preservation Act passed in 1966.

The National Park Service hired Murtagh as the first Keeper of the National Register of Historic Places and he collaborated with the State Historic Preservation Officers oversee the program and gather the first nominations. The program grew rapidly under Murtagh's tenure until his departure in 1979. He then helped lead preservation programs at Columbia University and the University of Maryland before returning as Vice President to the National Trust before moving to the University of Hawaii. Murtagh published “Keeping Time: The History and Theory of Preservation in the United States.” Later in life he resided at Penobscot, Maine and Sarasota, Florida where he died of heart failure in 2018.

References

1923 births
2018 deaths
20th-century American historians
American architectural historians
National Park Service personnel
People from Philadelphia
University of Pennsylvania alumni